Andrzej Person (born 14 May 1951 in Włocławek) is a Polish senator, representing Civic Platform.

References

1951 births
Living people
Nicolaus Copernicus University in Toruń alumni
Members of the Senate of Poland 2005–2007
People from Włocławek